Top Sergeant is a 1942 American crime film.  United States Army Sergeant Rusty Manson (Don Terry) is on maneuvers with slackers Frenchy Devereaux (Leo Carrillo) and Andy Jarrett (Andy Devine) when robbers attack them and kill Manson's brother 
Jack. The man who pulled the trigger, Al Bennett (Don Porter), later joins the army and is assigned to Manson's unit.

Cast
Don Terry – Sergeant Rusty Manson
Leo Carrillo – Frenchy Devereaux
Andy Devine – Andy Jarrett
Don Porter – Al Bennett
Gene Garrick – Jack Manson
Elyse Knox - Helen Gray
 Riley Hill (credited as Roy Harris) as Roy

References

External links
 
 
 
 

1942 films
American black-and-white films
American crime drama films
1942 crime drama films
1940s English-language films
1940s American films